Rhinusa pilosa is a species of true weevil in the family of beetles known as Curculionidae. It is found exclusively on
Linaria vulgaris Mill. (Plantaginaceae), also known as common or yellow toadflax where it creates a gall on the plant's stem, and was found originally in Serbia. R. pilosa has been introduced in the United States and Canada as an biocontrol agent to control L. vulgaris.

Two related species formerly considered part of R. pilosa are  Rhinusa brondelii and Rhinusa rara, which feed on Linaria purpurea and Linaria genistifolia/Linaria dalmatica, respectively.

References

External links

 
 

Curculioninae
Beetles described in 1838